Shush-e Olya (also Romanized as Shūsh-e ‘Olyā; also known as Shūsh, Shūsht-e Bālā, Shūsht-e ‘Olyā, and Sūsh) is a village in Babuyi Rural District, Basht District, Basht County, Kohgiluyeh and Boyer-Ahmad Province, Iran. At the 2006 census, its population was 245, in 43 families.

References 

Populated places in Basht County